The 2021 FAI Women's Cup (known as The EVOKE.ie FAI Women's Cup for sponsorship reasons) is the 46th edition of the Republic of Ireland's primary national knockout cup competition for women's association football teams. The nine Women's National League (WNL) teams entered the competition, but unlike in previous years no non-league teams took part. The competition began on 13 August 2021 with a single-fixture first round and concluded on 21 November 2021. The final was staged at the Tallaght Stadium in Dublin, which had also hosted the previous year's final.

The Cup holders Peamount United were eliminated at the semi-final stage.

First round

The draw for the first round took place on 3 August 2021. Women's National League (WNL) clubs Bohemians and DLR Waves were selected to play in a single match first round, the winner of which was to join the other seven WNL clubs in the quarter finals. Athlone Town, Galway and Treaty United received a bye to the quarter-finals, while the top four teams in the 2020 Women's National League (Peamount United, Shelbourne, Wexford Youths and Cork City) were exempt from the first round draw and qualified automatically for the quarter-finals. 

Teams in bold advanced to the quarter final.

Quarter-finals 

The draw for the quarter-finals took place on 27 August 2021. Teams in bold advanced to the semi-finals.

Semi-finals 

The draw for the semi-finals was made by Vera Pauw on 8 September 2021. Both matches took place on 9 October 2021.

Final

References 

2021 FAI Women's Cup
FAI Women's Cup seasons
2021 in Irish sport
2021 in Republic of Ireland association football cups

External links
FAI Women's Senior Cup at Football Association of Ireland